Arpadere may refer to:

 Arpadere, Çüngüş
 Arpadere, Hamamözü
 Arpadere, Hınıs
 Arpadere, İncirliova
 Arpadere, Pazaryeri